Winny Puhh is an Estonian metal/punk band formed in 1993 in Põlva. The founding members, Ove, Indrek, and Olavi knew each other from school. In 2009, the drummer Olavi Sander (Olevik) temporarily left the band and was replaced by Kristjan (Väikepax). Later however Olevik returned and the band has two drummers now. Many of their performances involve costumes.

Musical career 
Named after Winnie-the-Pooh. After thirteen years together, they became better known in 2006 with the song "Nuudlid ja hapupiim" (Noodles and Sour Milk) winning them a spot on Raadio 2's yearly hit songs.

In 2008, Winny Puhh's music video "Vanamutt" (The Old Lady) was nominated for the Estonian Music Awards (Eesti Muusikaauhinnad). In 2009, Henry Kõrvits, better known under the stage name G-Enka, joined Winny Puhh for the song "Peegelpõrand" (Mirror Floor), garnering them sixth place with 456 votes in the 2009 Raadio 2 Top 40.

In 2013, Winny Puhh participated in the Estonian national final for the 2013 Eurovision Song Contest with the song "Meiecundimees üks Korsakov läks eile Lätti" (Korsakov, the guy around our area, went to Latvia yesterday), but they finished third behind Birgit Õigemeel and Grete Paia. Olav Ruitlane and Mr. Korsakov (the character in the song) were sent for press interviews. An extended version of "Meiecundimees üks Korsakov läks eile Lätti" was performed in Paris at the Rick Owens fashion show.

Band members
 Indrek Vaheoja (Korraldajaonu) – Vocals
 Silver Lepaste (Kartauto) – Guitar
 Ove Musting (Jürnas Farmer) – Guitar, Vocals
 Indrek Nõmm (Koeraonu) – Bass guitar
 Kristjan Oden (Väikepax) – drums, percussion
 Olavi Sander (Doktor O) - drums, percussion

Albums
 Täämba õdagu praadimi kunna (Legendaarne Rokenroll Records, 2006)
 Brääznik (Legendaarne Rokenroll Records, 2010)
 Kes küsib (Clockwork Records, 2014)

References

Articles
 Vidrik Võsoberg. Winny Puhh ajab udu ja teeb uut plaati. LõunaLeht, 7 July 2009
 Mari Leosk. Setod: Winny Puhh pole mingid setod. LõunaLeht, 28 January 2010
 Russell Smith. Who (or what) is Winny Puhh? You'd know if you saw the Eurovision Song Contest. The Globe and Mail, 3 April 2013

External links
 Winny Puhhi koduleht

Estonian punk rock groups
Estonian musical groups
1993 establishments in Estonia
Musical groups established in 1993
Eesti Laul contestants